James Blunt: Return to Kosovo is a 2007 documentary film recorded in September 2006, when musician and former British Army Captain James Blunt returned to Kosovo to perform a concert for serving NATO troops, and to visit places and people he had encountered whilst serving in Kosovo in 1999.  The documentary was directed by Steven Cantor.

Synopsis
The documentary interlaces the footage filmed in 2006 with personal videos taken by Blunt in 1999, as well as news footage from the Kosovo conflict. Blunt was reunited with the three interpreters with whom he had worked when his unit was first sent to Kosovo. Together, they had intended to seek out families with whom Blunt and others had interacted; instead, they found abandoned and destroyed homes where these families had once lived. The group also returned to a mass grave that Blunt's squadron had been instrumental in identifying; it was now a traditional cemetery, where most of the dead have been identified and gravestones with their likenesses have been erected. Blunt performed songs from his Back to Bedlam album, including "You're Beautiful". Also included was his performance of No Bravery, a song about the conflict that Blunt wrote during his tour of duty in Kosovo.

Release and distribution
Return to Kosovo had its world premier at the South by Southwest Festival in Austin, Texas on 10 March 2007. In August 2007 the documentary was shown at the Dokufest film festival in Kosovo. At the end of 2008, the video was included with the release of the album All the Lost Souls - Deluxe Edition, increasing significantly its distribution worldwide. In March 2012, The Live Room powered by Warner Music, the Warner Music Group's official YouTube channel, uploaded the documentary in four parts entitled "James Blunt: Return to Kosovo [From The Vaults]", each episode subtitled as following:

 From Soldier to Singer
 Revisiting the Villages
 Life in the Villages Before and After
 The Inspiration behind "No Bravery"

References

External links
 
 SXSW Interview: Steven Cantor, ‘James Blunt: Return to Kosovo’

2007 films
Documentary films about singers
2007 documentary films
James Blunt
American documentary films
British documentary films
2000s English-language films
Films directed by Steven Cantor
2000s American films
2000s British films